iCube can refer to:

International Consortium of Universities for the Study of Biodiversity and the Environment (iCUBE)
Power Mac G4 Cube, a small form factor Macintosh personal computer from Apple Inc.
iCube Corporation, see Valups, a Korean company
iCube-1, a miniaturised satellite